Gardenia anapetes is a species of plant in the family Rubiaceae. It is endemic to the Fiji island of Vanua Levu.  The native gardenias of Fiji possess a diverse array of natural products.  Methoxylated and oxygenated flavonols and triterpenes accumulate on the vegetative- and floral-buds as droplets of secreted resin.  Phytochemical studies of these bud exudates have been published, including a population-level study of two other rare, sympatric species on Vanua Levu Island, G. candida and G. grievei.

References

Endemic flora of Fiji
anapetes
Critically endangered plants
Taxonomy articles created by Polbot